Mangkunegara IV (1809–1881) was the fourth ruler of Mangkunegaran, a principality based in Surakarta, Java, ruling from 1853 to 1881. He was son-in-law of Mangkunegara III. His title before ascending was Prince Adipati Prangwedana III.

During his reign, the foundations of estate agriculture producing coffee and sugar were established, he became the first non-European to own sugar factories (De Tjolomadoe and Tasikmadu factory). The profits from the system were reinvested in the domains, instead of being sent abroad, as happened in many colonial situations; however, as typical for a less-developed economy, the inhabitants were dependent on the world price of these cash crops. He abolished the appanage system of compensating his retainers and officials and instead paid them salaries. Nevertheless, Mangkunegara IV had to deal with the Kingdom of Netherlands as well as the other rulers in central Java of the period. In 1857 and 1877, he was unable to reclaim land leased to European planters.

Mangkunegara IV's court is especially known for its contributions to the traditional arts. He himself was a prominent poet who collaborated with Raden Ngabei Ranggawarsita (1802–1873), said to be the last of the great court poets. Mangkunegara IV's most famous poem is Wedhatama ("Exalted Wisdom"), which praises morality consistent with the mystical Islam of Java, in contrast to the more self-consciously Orthodox Islamic community.

He is also credited with the composition of several ketawang, a gamelan musical form, including Puspawarna, which was included in the Voyager's Golden Record sent to outer space in the 1970s.

References

1809 births
1881 deaths
People from Surakarta
Princes of Mangkunegaran
19th-century Indonesian people